"Jet City Woman" is a song by heavy metal band Queensrÿche. First appearing on their 1990 album Empire, it was released as a single in May 1991 in the US, and August 1991 in Europe.

The song talks about coming home to family after a long road trip.  "Jet City" is a nickname for Seattle, the band's hometown. It was written about Geoff Tate's first wife, who was a flight attendant. This song appeared in Guitar Hero: Warriors of Rock.

The eye on the single art is actor Rob Findlay.

Track listing
CD single USA

CD single Europe 

vinyl 7 single

Chart performance

Personnel
Geoff Tate - vocals, keyboards
Chris DeGarmo - lead guitar
Michael Wilton - rhythm guitar
Eddie Jackson - bass
Scott Rockenfield - drums

References

1990 songs
1991 singles
EMI America Records singles
Queensrÿche songs
Song recordings produced by Peter Collins (record producer)
Songs written by Chris DeGarmo
Songs written by Geoff Tate
American hard rock songs